The Fitzroy sandslider (Lerista simillima) is a species of skink found in Western Australia.

References

Lerista
Reptiles described in 1984
Taxa named by Glen Milton Storr